Salah Chaoua (24 August 1946 – 11 August 2020) was a Tunisian footballer.

Chaoua played at the forward position for Club Africain in Tunisia and Al-Madina SC in Libya. He also played in six games for the Tunisian national team.

Awards
Champion of Tunisian Ligue Professionnelle 1 (1964, 1967)
Winner of the Tunisian Cup (1965, 1967, 1968, 1969, 1970)
Winner of the Maghreb Cup Winners Cup (1971)
Champion of the Libyan Premier League (1976)
Winner of the Libyan Cup (1976)

References

1946 births
2020 deaths
Tunisian footballers
Tunisia international footballers
Club Africain players
Al-Madina SC players
People from Tunis
Association football forwards
Libyan Premier League players